"I Talk to the Wind" is the second track from the British progressive rock band King Crimson's debut album, In the Court of the Crimson King.

Starting immediately after the cacophony that ends "21st Century Schizoid Man", the mood of this song is a stark contrast; it is serene, simple and peaceful. Ian McDonald's flute begins the song, and is one of the lead instruments throughout. He also plays a classical-inspired solo in the middle of the song as a "C" section and a longer one at the end as a coda.

An earlier demo version of this song may be found on the now out-of-print LP A Young Person's Guide to King Crimson, which featured Robert Fripp (guitar), Peter Giles (bass), Michael Giles (drums), and Ian McDonald (flute), along with Judy Dyble (formerly of Fairport Convention) on vocals. This version was more up-tempo and lighter in instrumentation.  The Young Person's Guide recording and another demo of the same song were recorded in 1968 by Giles, Giles and Fripp.  However, the song did not actually appear on a Giles, Giles and Fripp record until The Brondesbury Tapes (1968) was released on CD in 2002. There are actually two recordings of "I Talk to the Wind" on this CD; one features vocals by Judy Dyble, and the other features vocals by Peter Giles.

Personnel
 Ian McDonald – flute, clarinet, organ, piano, vocals
 Robert Fripp – electric guitar
 Greg Lake – bass guitar, vocals
 Michael Giles – drums
 Peter Sinfield – lyrics

Opus III version

In 1992, the song was covered by English electronic music group Opus III, whose lead vocalist was Kirsty Hawkshaw. It was released as the follow-up to their successful "It's a Fine Day" and the second single from their debut album, Mind Fruit (1992). The single peaked at number six in Finland, number 52 in the United Kingdom and number 162 in Australia. The accompanying music video for "I Talk to the Wind" is similar to the video for "It's a Fine Day", featuring Hawkshaw with her head shaved and dressed in a silvery bodysuit with silver boots and silver make-up.

Critical reception
AllMusic editor MacKenzie Wilson felt the group's "crafty version" of King Crimson's "I Talk to the Wind" "composes a dreamy synthetic wave." He also noted Kirsty Hawkshaw's "dove-like vocals transcended into freewheeling soundscapes". Randy Clark from Cashbox wrote that her "childlike and breathy voice blows through this dance track like a gentle breeze." Dave Simpson from Melody Maker viewed it as "another sublime reinvention". Andy Beevers from Music Week opined that the song is similar in style to "It's a Fine Day", "but is nowhere as special." Roger Morton from NME declared it as "excellent". Sian Pattenden from Smash Hits gave it two out of five, remarking that "the flutes whisper along merrily with the bubbly syntheramic background".

Track listings
 Europe 7-inch single (1992)
 "I Talk to the Wind" (edit) – 4:06
 "Sea People" – 6:00

 UK 12-inch single (1992)
 "I Talk to the Wind" (extended mix) – 6:11
 "Sea People" – 5:33

 UK CD single (1992)
 "I Talk to the Wind" (edit) – 4:06
 "I Talk to the Wind" (12-inch extended mix) – 6:11
 "Sea People" – 6:00

Charts

References

King Crimson songs
1969 songs
Opus III (band) songs
1992 singles
Pete Waterman Entertainment singles
Songs written by Ian McDonald (musician)
Song recordings produced by Greg Lake
Songs with lyrics by Peter Sinfield

it:In the Court of the Crimson King#Tracce
he:In the Court of the Crimson King#I Talk to the Wind